Palwancha is a town in Bhadradri district of the Indian state of Telangana. It is located in Palwancha mandal of Kothagudem revenue division.

Demographics 
Palwancha is a Municipality city in district of Bhadradri district , Telangana . The Palwancha city is divided into 39 wards for which elections are held every 5 years. The Palwancha Municipality has population of 130,199 of which 49,923 are males while 50,276 are females as per report released by Census India 2014.

Population of Children with age of 0-6 is 12207 which is 10.23% of total population of Palwancha (M). In Palwancha Municipality, Female Sex Ratio is of 1009 against state average of 993. Moreover Child Sex Ratio in Palwancha is around 970 compared to Andhra Pradesh state average of 939. Literacy rate of Palwancha city is 77.70% higher than state average of 67.02%. In Palwancha, Male literacy is around 84.41% while female literacy rate is 71.09%.

Palwancha Municipality has total administration over 20,782 houses to which it supplies basic amenities like water and sewerage. It is also authorize to build roads within Municipality limits and impose taxes on properties coming under its jurisdiction.
Kothagudem Thermal Power Station (KTPS) is located at Palwancha.

Palwancha Town is also known for its versatility
Festivals are celebrated with much fervor and people used to go to temples on these days to offer special prayers. Some of the festivals are Dasara, Eid ul fitr, Bakrid, Ugadi, Makara Sankranti, Guru Purnima , Sri Rama Navami, Hanuman Jayanti, Raakhi Pournami, Vinayaka Chaviti , Nagula Panchami, Krishnashtami, Deepavali, Mukkoti Ekadasi, Karthika Purnima and Ratha Saptami. People in Palwancha not only celebrate the main festivals, but also celebrate certain regional festivals like Bonalu, Batukamma all over Telangana districts, Yedupayala Jatara in Medak, Sammakka Saralamma in Warangal district.

Transport

Road

Palvacha is well connected to major cities and towns in Telangana and Andhra Pradesh.

TSRTC operates buses to various destinations from Khammam bus station of the city.

Rail

Palvancha has no railway station. It is located between Kothagudem Railway Station (known as Bhadrachalam Road/ BDCR Road) and Manuguru Railway Station line of the South Central Railway. The nearest railway station is Kothagudem Railway Station (Bhadrachalam Road. Station Code is BDCR).

Education 
Palwancha City has proper educational facilities for students. There are many government schools known as Zilla Parishad High Schools as well as private schools including, D.A.V Model School run by TSGENCO, NavaBharat Public School, Regina Carmeli Convent High School, Triveni Talent School, Al-Kausar School. Engineering colleges like Adams Engineering College, ABIT Engineering College, KLR Institutions around Palvancha city. It also has other institutions like Pharmacy, MBA, MCA Colleges. NDC & KLR Degree and PG College also conducts archaeological research on megalithic sites.

The University College of Engineering, Kakatiya University is also located at Palvancha City outskirts.

Tourism 
Palwancha City has tourism spots like Kinnerasani Wildlife Sanctuary, and boat riding facility in Kinnerasani dam also sanctioned by Telangana Tourism Development Corporation

References

External links 
Palvancha Municipality Property Tax Payment

Cities and towns in Bhadradri Kothagudem district
Mandals in Bhadradri Kothagudem district